The Ascensor Barón, built in 1906, is a funicular located on its namesake hill in Valparaíso, Chile, and was declared a Historic Monument on September 1, 1998.

Description 
The Ascensor Barón has great urban significance by virtue of being the connection between the Plan de Valparaíso with one of the most tourist scenic viewpoints in the eastern section of the natural amphitheater where sits the city. This viewpoint formed part of the old road to Quillota, which joined Valparaíso     to the hacienda of the Siete Hermanas (the land currently occupied by the city of Viña del Mar).

Located on the Barón Hill, the funicular connects the España and Argentina avenues, on the flat part of the city, with the Diego Portales street of the hill. It is nearby the Barón Station, which is connected to the rest of the metropolitan area.

Inaugurated on April 17, 1909, its first owner was the defunct Compañía de Tracción Eléctrica (CTE). It was the first electrical funicular in the city, system that replaced the previous water counterbalance system. The electric engine was brought from Germany.

Like the other surviving funiculars of Valparaíso, it was declared a Historic Monument.

See also 
Funicular railway
Funicular railways of Valparaíso
List of funicular railways
Valparaíso

References 

Funicular railways in Chile
Buildings and structures in Valparaíso